Viktoria-Luise-Platz is a Berlin U-Bahn station located on the .
In 1910, Town of Schöneberg, now a part of Berlin, built its own subway line, the U4. This station was built by E.Deneke. This shallow (4.2 m) station is decorated by green and white tiles on the walls as well as green tiles on the columns. Both the square and the subway station are protected by law as historic landmarks.

During the Second World War, bombing destroyed the station entrance; it was rebuilt in a simplified style after the war. After renovation, the entrance on Geisbergstrasse opened in 2003 and an elevator was added in 2020. The nearest stations "Nollendorfplatz" and "Bayerischer Platz", are both  865 m away.

References

U4 (Berlin U-Bahn) stations
Buildings and structures in Tempelhof-Schöneberg
Railway stations in Germany opened in 1910